Syon Lane railway station in Travelcard Zone 4 is on the Hounslow Loop Line and borders the Spring Grove and New Brentford neighbourhoods of the London Borough of Hounslow in west London. The office and light industrial zone to the north-east, the West Cross Centre, has among other businesses the headquarters and studios of broadcaster and entertainment multinational company Sky.  The station and all trains serving it are operated by South Western Railway.

History
The Southern Railway opened Syon Lane station 81 years after the line, on 5 July 1931.

In December 2020, South Western Railway finished work to make the station fully accessible. A new footbridge has been installed with a lift providing step-free access to the Hounslow-bound platform, with an improved step-free footpath for the Waterloo-bound platform.

Lobbying attempts for direct longer-distance and Heathrow Airport services

Hounslow Council unsuccessfully proposed that the Hounslow Loop Line be part of the Crossrail route with its inter-regional trains calling at all stations west of Kew Bridge. Planning consultants rejected the proposal in a final route presented to Parliament in 2008.  The loop line itself although partially operating services as a through line to Weybridge in Surrey is constrained by level crossings on the Windsor and Reading line running from London Waterloo – four in the town of Egham of the 15 in total along the whole main route and its Weybridge spur are concentrated there in quick succession – whose local authority for transport Surrey County Council and Chamber of Commerce object to full-capacity timetabling without tunnelling beneath or bridging over most of the level crossings.

Amenities and set-up
The station instead of a building has a passenger shelter on each platform and is set below steps at the foot of a north–south humpback bridge formed by Syon Lane, which crosses the Great West Road at Gillette Corner 100m north.  A street-level third entrance, from the convergence of Northumberland, Hexham and Rothbury Gardens (streets), connects the eastbound platform.

Services 

The typical off-peak service from the station in trains per hour is:
 4 direct to  via 
 2 circuitously to Waterloo via  and Richmond
 2 to 

On Sundays, two trains per hour to/from London Waterloo call at Syon Lane that continue alternately to/from Woking to the south-west on a mainline and to/from Twickenham and Kingston to the south on the Kingston loop line.

The vast majority of services from Syon Lane are operated by Class 707 or Class 458 electric multiple units.

Connections
London Buses route H28 serves the station.

Notes and references
References

Notes

External links 

Railway stations in the London Borough of Hounslow
Former Southern Railway (UK) stations
Railway stations in Great Britain opened in 1931
Railway stations served by South Western Railway
Brentford, London